Fall Creek is a  long 2nd order tributary to the Cape Fear River in Lee County, North Carolina.

Course
Fall Creek rises in a pond about 0.25 miles northwest of Broadway, North Carolina and then flows northeasterly to join the Cape Fear River about 4 miles south of Corinth.

Watershed
Fall Creek drains  of area, receives about 47.5 in/year of precipitation, has a wetness index of 392.92 and is about 57% forested.

See also
List of rivers of North Carolina

References

Rivers of North Carolina
Rivers of Lee County, North Carolina
Tributaries of the Cape Fear River